Batajnica railway station is a railway station of Belgrade railway junction, Belgrade–Šid and Belgrade–Subotica railway. Located in Batajnica, Zemun, Belgrade. Railroad continued to Nova Pazova in one, in the other direction to Zemun Polje and the third direction towards to Surčin. Batajnica railway station consists of 11 railway track.

See also 
 Serbian Railways
 Beovoz
 BG Voz

References

External links
 

Railway stations in Belgrade
Zemun